Highway M06 is a Ukrainian international highway (M-highway) connecting Kyiv to the Hungarian border near Chop, where it continues as Hungarian main road 4 to Záhony and Budapest.

General overview
The M06 is a major transnational corridor and along with the M03 combines into European route E40. The highway is also part of the Pan-European Transportation corridors III and V as well as the "Europe-Asia" Transportation corridor. For most of its length it is categorized as the category Ia highway in Ukraine (see Roads in Ukraine). The M06 connects four major European routes: E40, E50, E85, and E95.

History 
The route from Lemberg via Stryj to the then Austro-Hungarian border belonged until 1918 to the Austrian crown land of Galicia and was called the Stryjer Reichsstraße.

Description
From Kyiv to Lviv the M06 is part of European route E40, European route E471 from Lviv to Mukachevo, European route E50 from Stryi (Lviv Region) to Uzhhorod, and European route E573 from Uzhhorod to the Hungarian border.

From Kyiv to Rivne, the road features 2 lanes in both directions with physical separation, with the exception of Zhytomyr bypass. From Rivne on, the road is mostly a single carriageway, though some dual carriageway sections exist.

During May 2022, several segments of this road were closed due to 2022 Russian invasion of Ukraine. Until 1 April, several civilians have been killed while they were trying to leave Kyiv.

Main route

Main route and connections to/intersections with other highways in Ukraine.

The route starts at the intersection of the Kyiv's beltway and Victory Parkway (Prospekt Peremohy), for which it serves as an extension. It used to be known as Brest-Litovsk Highway (Brest-Lytovske Shose).

Notes
  intersects  on its city's northern access route away from the main branch.

Access routes
The highway passes the following cities going around them, however it has spurred away access routes towards them.
 Zhytomyr 
 Zviahel 
 Lviv 
 Rivne

Gallery

See also

 Roads in Ukraine
 Ukraine Highways
 International E-road network
 Pan-European corridors

References

External links
  Webpage dedicated to M06
  International Roads in Ukraine
  European Roads

Roads in Kyiv
Roads in Kyiv Oblast
Roads in Lviv Oblast
Roads in Rivne Oblast
Roads in Zakarpattia Oblast
Roads in Zhytomyr Oblast
European route E40
European route E50